may refer to:

 Sazanami (train), a limited express train service in Japan
 , two destroyers of the Imperial Japanese Navy and one of the Japanese Maritime Self-Defense Force